Kathryn Erskine is an American writer of children's literature. She won the 2010 National Book Award for Young People's Literature and the 2012 Dolly Gray Children's Literature Award for her novel, Mockingbird.

Life
Erskine's family traveled widely during her childhood due to her father's career. She was born in the Netherlands and has lived in South Africa, Israel, Canada, and Scotland. Erskine now lives in Virginia with her husband, Bill. She has two children, Fiona and Gavin. She also has a dog named Maxine. 

She was a lawyer for many years before writing.
She presents workshops at the Writer's Center.

Bibliography
 Quaking, Penguin, 2007, 
 Mockingbird, Penguin, 2010,  — winner of the National Book Award
 
 Seeing Red, Scholastic, 2013, 
 Mama Africa!: How Miriam Makeba Spread Hope with Her Song, Farrar, Straus and Giroux (BYR), 
 The Badger Knight, Scholastic, 2014, ISBN 978-0-54546442-0

References

External links
 
"Q & A with Kathryn Erskine", Publishers Weekly, Sue Corbett, April 8, 2010
 

American children's writers
National Book Award for Young People's Literature winners
College of William & Mary alumni
Dutch emigrants to the United States
Living people
Year of birth missing (living people)